Antoni Jan Goetz (also Antoni Jan Goetz-Okocimski) (17 December 1895 – 31 October 1962) was a Polish industrialist, politician and activist. In the 1930s he was the sole owner of the Okocim Brewery in Brzesko, Poland. He was a delegate to the Sejm (parliament) of the Second Polish Republic.

Antoni Jan Goetz was born in Krakow; he was the son of Jan Albin Goetz and the grandson of Johann Evangelist Götz.

Political activity

Goetz was a delegate to the Polish Sejm between 1935 and 1938.

After the German invasion of Poland in 1939, Goetz, together with his family fled Poland on September 5, fearing repressions from the Nazis, who subsequently took over the Okocim Brewery. He made his way to France where he served as an adjutant at the Polish "Centrum Wyszkolenia Artylerii" (Center for Artillery Studies) in Brittany at Camp Coëtquidan.

He died in 1962 in Nairobi, Kenya from a tropical disease.

Efforts in 2017 of bringing Antoni Goetz-Okocimski's ashes back to Poland from Kenya were successful.

On 21 October 2017 a large funeral ceremony, which included events at the Goetz family palace, was held in Okocim, as per Antoni's wishes to be buried alongside his family. The event was attended by Antoni Goetz-Okocimski's family, politicians, historians, members of the Polish armed forces, executives of Okocim & Carlsberg breweries, and citizens of the city of Brzesko.

An exhibition was also organized on Antoni and his family at the Museum in Brzesko, it was entitled "A return from emigration".

References

1895 births
1962 deaths
Politicians from Kraków
People from the Kingdom of Galicia and Lodomeria
Nonpartisan Bloc for Cooperation with the Government politicians
Members of the Sejm of the Second Polish Republic (1935–1938)